The 1931–32 Connecticut Aggies men's basketball team represented Connecticut Agricultural College, now the University of Connecticut, in the 1931–32 collegiate men's basketball season. The Aggies completed the season with a 3–11 overall record. The Aggies were members of the New England Conference, where they ended the season with a 0–3 record. The Aggies played their home games at Hawley Armory in Storrs, Connecticut, and were led by first-year head coach John J. Heldman, Jr.

Schedule 

|-
!colspan=12 style=""| Regular Season

Schedule Source:

References 

UConn Huskies men's basketball seasons
Connecticut
1931 in sports in Connecticut
1932 in sports in Connecticut